An election to Wexford County Council took place on 23 May 2014 as part of that year's Irish local elections. 34 councillors were elected from three electoral divisions by PR-STV voting for a five-year term of office, an increase of 13 seats from the previous election in 2009. In addition the Wexford Borough Council, Enniscorthy Town Council, Gorey Town Council and New Ross Town Council were all abolished.

The lionshare of the additional seats went to Fianna Fáil and Sinn Féin who were the big winners in this set of elections in Wexford. Fianna Fáil also supplanted Fine Gael as the largest party but the additional seats helped to reduce the impact on the party as they only lost 1 seat. Labour lost half of their seats as Independents trebled their membership on the Council and People Before Profit won a seat.

Results by party

Results by Electoral Area

Enniscorthy

Gorey

New Ross

Wexford

References

Post-Election Changes
†Enniscorthy Fianna Fáil Councillor James Browne was elected as a TD for Wexford at the Irish general election, 2016. Willie Kavanagh was co-opted to fill the vacancy on 15 March 2016.
††Wexford Fianna Fáil Councillor Fergie Kehoe died on 9 April 2016. Lisa McDonald was co-opted to fill the vacancy on 11 July 2016.
†††Wexford PBPA Councillor Deirdre Wadding resigned her seat on 27 October 2017 citing mental health caused by stress. In November 2017 Tony Walsh was co-opted to fill the vacancy.
††††Wexford Sinn Féin Councillor Anthony Kelly resigned his seat on 5 December 2017 due to ill-health. On 2 January Thomas Forde was co-opted to fill the vacancy.
†††††New Ross Sinn Féin Councillor Oisin O'Connell resigned his seat on 10 December 2018 citing family and work pressures. Marie Doyle was co-opted to fill the vacancy in January 2019.
††††††New Ross Independent Councillor Martin Murphy announced his resignation on 9 March 2019 in advance of the 2019 Local Elections to enable another person fill the vacancy.

External links
 Wexford County Council

2014 Irish local elections
2014